TBBS is an acronym that may refer to
The Bread Board System, a DOS based commercial bulletin board system, or
Total Body Bone Scan, a nuclear diagnostic imaging technique